Ari David Starace (born July 27, 1994), professionally known as Y2K, is an American record producer and songwriter. He is best known for his hit song "Lalala", with Canadian rapper bbno$, which Y2K produced himself. However, he has also produced tracks for other prominent artists, most notably Doja Cat, Polyphia and Yung Gravy. It should also be noted that he was a co-producer of Doja’s hit song “Get Into It (Yuh)”.

Early life 
Y2K was introduced to music at an early age; his mother owned a music store in Arizona, which he has said was where his interest in music began.

Career 
According to Y2K, his introduction to music production was from California rapper, Lil B, who introduced him to Clams Casino. Following this, Y2K began to work on music, making remixes exclusively for a few years before making the decision to start producing for others, such as bbno$, Yung Gravy and lil aaron.

Influences 
Y2K began listening to Gorillaz, and Tears for Fears, which he has mentioned were his earliest influences in music. As he got older, he began listening to bands such as My Chemical Romance, and Say Anything.

Discography

Singles

Produced by Y2K

Notes

References

1994 births
Living people
Record producers from Arizona
Musicians from Arizona
Columbia Records artists
Ableton Live users